Bailey Island is an island in Casco Bay, and a part of the town of Harpswell, in Cumberland County, Maine.  As of the 2000 census, the island had a year-round population of 400.

History
Bailey Island originally bore the name Newaggin, given to it by the local Abenaki Native Americans, and was first populated by European settlers in the 17th century.

The first settler of the island was William Black, son of Black Will who was a freed slave from Kittery, Maine. William sold the land his father had left him in the Upper Parish of Kittery and settled permanently on Bailey's Island. Because of this, the island became known as Will's Island.

The story goes that in 1742, Reverend Timothy Bailey may have bought Will's Island for one pound of tobacco and a gallon of rum from William Black. In another variation of the story, the minister's wife liked the island and so the Baileys bribed municipal officials to find a flaw in Will's title to the island and award it to them.  In any event, after Timothy Bailey and his wife took possession of the island, William Black left to live on Orr's Island. From then on, the island was known as Bailey Island.

On July 27th 2020, Bailey Island was the site of Maine’s only fatal shark attack in recorded history. A 63 year-old woman from New York City was fatally mauled by a confirmed Great White shark while swimming with her 27 year-old daughter. She was only 20 yards from the Bailey Island shore.

Bridge

The Bailey Island Bridge, which spans Will's Gut and connects Bailey Island to Orr's Island, was completed in 1928.  Will's Gut is the only geographical feature that still bears the name of the original non-native inhabitant of the island.

It is the only cribstone bridge in the world, which is made up of rocks, sand and gravel. A popular rumor held that there was another cribstone bridge in Scotland that was later destroyed, but no records of such a bridge have ever been found. The unique cribstone design of the bridge permits the substantial tides of that area to flow freely through it, greatly reducing the effect that flow would otherwise have on boats transiting its narrow channel opening. The Island is also known for its statewide football game that is held every year on the island.

Notable residents

Three prominent female psychoanalysts, Esther Harding, Eleanor Bertine, and Kristine Mann, were followers of Carl Jung and long-time summer residents of Bailey Island.  Kristine Mann, known in Jung's work as ″Miss X”, was one of Jung's subjects. Jung is also known to have visited Bailey Island and to have lectured at the Bailey Island Library Hall.

Illustrator Ida Waugh and writer Amy Ella Blanchard, lifelong companions, owned adjacent summer cottages on the island. Together they organized the founding of a summer chapel for the Episcopal church. The chapel was completed in 1916.

Frank Aydelotte, president of Swarthmore College, summered at Bailey Island where he became acquainted with Holbrook Mann MacNeille and Stephan Mann MacNeille in the 1920s. With Aydelotte's encouragement, both attended Swarthmore and later went on to lead distinguished careers in physics and mathematics.

Another prominent summer resident was the Civil War-era composer George Frederick Root, who died on August 6, 1895, while summering on the island.

Landmarks
 Bailey Island Bridge;
 Mackerel Cove, one of the most photographed places in Maine;
 Land's End, a famous rocky beach at the end of the island;
 the 'Maine Lobsterman', a bronze statue originally created for the 1939 World's Fair;
 The Giant Stairs (also known as "The Giant's Steps"), a rock formation on the edge of the island resembling a large flight of stairs;
 “The Nubble″, an often-photographed bait shack where all the local lobstermen leave their buoys;
 Two World War II-era fire control towers near the southern tip of the island.

References

 Nancy Orr Johnson Jensen, Bailey Island: Memories, Pictures & Lore, Mayhaven Publishing, 2003, .
 Harpswell Historical Society Website
 Beth E. Hill (1992), The Evolution of Bailey's Island
Peter P. Hill, Ph.D, "Summer Days and Childhood Shenanigans" https://maineboats.com/print/issue-145/summer-days-and-childhood-shenanigans

External links

 Photograph of the Bailey Island ferry, ca. 1910, from the Maine Memory Network

 
Harpswell, Maine